Zixi Subdistrict is the most populous subdistrict within Yanjiang District, Ziyang, Sichuan Province, China. As of 2010, Zixi had a population of 83,356 people.

History 
The district was created in 2005 by order of the Sichuan Provincial Government as part of a reshuffling of Yanjiang District.

Administrative divisions
Zixi is divided into 11 residential communities: Qiaotingzi Residential Community, Bajiaojing Residential Community, Hongfeng Residential Community, Huangnijing Residential Community, Jiuquhe Residential Community, Guihuajing Residential Community, Shiyuan Residential Community, Yannan Residential Community, Nanjun Residential Community, Ximenqiao Residential Community, and Zixi Residential Community.

References 

Township-level divisions of Sichuan
Subdistricts of the People's Republic of China
Ziyang